The Wannian Bridge is a historic stone arch bridge over the Yangzhi River in the town of Huicheng, She County, Anhui, China.

History
The original bridge dates back to 1573 during the Wanli era of the Ming dynasty (1368–1644), and rebuilt in 1894 during the reign of Guangxu Emperor of the Qing dynasty (1644–1911).

In June 2012, it has been inscribed as a provincial-level cultural heritage site by the Government of Anhui.

Gallery

References

Bridges in Anhui
Arch bridges in China
Bridges completed in 1573
Qing dynasty architecture
Buildings and structures completed in 1573
1573 establishments in China